In Russia, Latvians are a small ethnic minority scattered across its various regions. In the 2010 census, 18,979 in Russia identified as ethnic Latvian, down from 28,520 in 2002.

History

There have been several waves of migration of Latvians to Russia following the annexation of the Latvian lands by the Russian Empire in the 18th century.

During the 19th century, many landless Latvian peasants moved eastwards, establishing settlements in Siberia and the Urals. Thousands of Latvians migrated to Russia as refugees during the First World War. A number of Latvian Bolshevik politicians and activists settled down in Russia after the Russian civil war and became members of the Soviet state leadership.

According to the results of the First All-Union Census of the Soviet Union of 1926, more than 151,000 ethnic Latvians lived in the USSR. Numerous Latvian cultural organizations, publishing houses and schools were created in various regions of the USSR. The largest and most influential organization was Prometejs Society, headquartered in Moscow.

In the 1930s, thousands of Latvians faced repressions by the regime of Joseph Stalin. Starting from November 1936, the NKVD carried out the so-called "Latvian Operation", a mass campaign of repressions targeting specifically persons of Latvian origin. First of all, the targets were activists of Latvian organizations, former Red Latvian Riflemen, immigrants from independent Latvia, and even senior governmental officials and prominent communist revolutionaries like Jānis Rudzutaks, Jukums Vācietis, Jānis Bērziņš, and others. More than 21,300 persons were sentenced during the operation, of which 16,575 were executed. In total, about 70,000 ethnic Latvians in the USSR were killed during the repressions of the 1930s.

After the Soviet re-occupation of Latvia in 1944 and establishment of the Latvian SSR, a few Latvians migrated within the USSR, in particular to Moscow and Leningrad. During Perestroika in the 1980s, new organizations of the Latvian diaspora have been established in major cities. Many Latvians went back from Russia to Latvia following the collapse of the Soviet Union and the restoration of the independence of Latvia.

Latvian settlements in Russia
An autonomous Latvian municipality exists in the Russian republic of Bashkortostan – the Arch-Latvian Selsoviet. Latvian settlers came to the region in the 19th century. The Latvian municipality was established in the 1920s, during the ethnic emancipation of the early Soviet years (Korenizatsiya). The Latvian kolkhoz Jaunā dzīve ("New Life") was established there in 1929. Today, Latvians make up approximately 300 out of almost 2000 inhabitants of the municipality.

In Siberia (modern Krasnoyarsk Krai), the village Nizhnyaya Bulanka was founded by Latvian settlers in 1859. The village still exists and has less than one hundred inhabitants.

Organizations

Since the 1990s, there is a number of Latvian organizations and Latvian Lutheran parishes in Russia, primarily in major cities such as Moscow, Saint Petersburg, Omsk, Tomsk, Smolensk and others.

Burials
Several Latvian communists are buried in the Kremlin Wall Necropolis in Moscow: Pēteris Stučka, Arvīds Pelše, Jānis Lepse, Jānis Valdovskis, Oto Vērzemnieks, Jānis Zvejnieks, as well as the Riga-born scientist Mstislav Keldysh.

Russians of Latvian descent
 Petr Aven, businessman and former government minister
 Alexei Kudrin, statesman, former finance minister
 Vladimir Vladimirovich Kara-Murza, politician and human rights activist
 Valdis Pelšs, television presenter
 Dmitry Nagiyev, actor, TV-host, musician, showman and radio host
 Alexander Auzan, economist, head of economics department of the Moscow State University

Latvians in the Soviet Union
 Otto Schmidt, scientist, explorer of the Arctic, Hero of the Soviet Union
 Pēteris Stučka, first president of the Supreme Court of the Soviet Union
 Jukums Vācietis, the first commander-in-chief of the Red Army
 Jānis Fabriciuss, widely memorialized commander in the Red Army during the Russian Civil War and in the 1920s
 Jēkabs Alksnis, commander of the Red Army Air Forces from 1931 to 1937
 Jānis Rudzutaks, Soviet government minister, member of the Politburo of the Communist Party of the Soviet Union
 Valērijs Mežlauks, Chairman of the State Planning Committee (Gosplan) in 1934 – 1937
 Jānis Lencmanis, Arvīds Zeibots and Jānis Bērziņš, creators of the Soviet military intelligence   
 Jānis Mežlauks, first General Secretary of the Communist Party of the Turkmen SSR
 Vilhelms Knoriņš, head of the Communist Party of the Belarusian SSR in 1920 – 1923 and in 1927 – 1928
 Jānis Strods, commander of Soviet troops in Yakutia during the Yakut revolt
 Karl Bauman, statesman, member of the Central Committee elected by the 17th Congress of the All-Union Communist Party (Bolsheviks)
 Boris Pugo, Minister of Interior in the USSR, member of the GKChP in the 1991 Soviet coup d'état attempt
 Arvīds Pelše, member of the Politburo of the Communist Party of the Soviet Union
 Jānis Bērziņš, Ambassador of the Soviet Union to Austria between 1925 and 1927
 Jānis Lācis, Red Army commander, member of the Central Executive Committee of the Russian Soviet Federative Socialist Republic
 Otto Lācis, Soviet and Russian journalist

Latvian Baltic Germans in Russia and the Soviet Union
 Sergei Eisenstein, film director of Baltic German or Baltic Jewish origin
 Michael Andreas Barclay de Tolly, Russian field marshal during the 1812 war with Napoleon
 Ernst Johann von Biron, Regent of Russia in 1737–1740
 Yevgeny Miller, general and one of the leaders of the anticommunist White Army during and after the Russian Civil War
 Wilfried Strik-Strikfeldt, officer of the White Army during the Russian Civil War and of the Russian Liberation Army during World War II
 House of Lieven, an aristocratic family allegedly descending from Livonian tribal leaders

See also

 Latvian Operation of the NKVD

References

Latvian diaspora

Latvia–Russia relations